The 2022 World Short Track Speed Skating Championships were the 46th edition, held from April 8 to 10, 2022 at Maurice Richard Arena in Montreal, Canada. World Short Track Speed Skating Championships have been contested since 1976.

Due to the Covid-19 pandemic, the event was moved back three weeks from the original dates of March 18 to 20.

Schedule
All times are local (UTC−4).

Medal summary

Medal table

Men

Women

Nations
The following nations sent skaters to these Championships. Due to the Russian invasion of Ukraine, skaters representing Russia or Belarus were not allowed to participate.

References

External links
Results
Results book

World Short Track Speed Skating Championships
World Championships
International speed skating competitions hosted by Canada
World Short Track Speed Skating Championships
World Short Track Speed Skating Championships
Sports competitions in Montreal